is a railway station located in the city of Kitaakita, Akita Prefecture, Japan, operated by the third sector railway operator Akita Nairiku Jūkan Railway.

Lines
Yonaizawa Station is served by the Nariku Line, and is located 15.0 km from the terminus of the line at Takanosu Station.

Station layout
The station consists of one side platform serving a single bi-directional track. The station is unattended.

Adjacent stations

History
Yonaizawa Station opened on December 10, 1934 as a station on the Japan National Railways (JNR) serving the village of Maeda, Akita. The line was extended on to Aniai Station by September 25, 1936. The line was privatized on November 1, 1986, becoming the Akita Nairiku Jūkan Railway.

Surrounding area
 
 
former Moriyoshi Town Hall
Ani River

External links

 Nairiku Railway Station information 

Railway stations in Japan opened in 1936
Railway stations in Akita Prefecture
Kitaakita